Troides aeacus, the golden birdwing, is a large tropical butterfly belonging to the swallowtail family, Papilionidae.

Description 

Troides aeacus has a wingspan of about  but can be as large as 194 mm. In the males the forewings are black, with veins bordered by whitish colour, while the hindwings are bright yellow. The underside of the wings is quite similar to the upside. The females are larger than the males and have dark-brown or black wings. Head, thorax and abdomen of this butterfly are mainly black, with small red patches on the thorax and a yellow underside of the abdomen. Caterpillars are pale brown, with long protrusions resembling thorns. They mainly feed on Aristolochia and Thottea species (Aristolochiaceae).

Troides aeacus closely resembles Troides helena cerebrus and differs as follows:
Upperside, forewing: the pale adnervular streaks more prominent, in some specimens extended into the cell along the outer half of the subcostal and of the median nervules. 
Hindwing: the cone-shaped terminal black markings in interspaces 2, 3, and 4 more or less broadly bordered on the inner side by a dusky area that is irrorated with blackish scales; the black on the costal margin narrower, not extended below vein 8.

Underside similar to the upperside, but the dusky black borders to the cone-shaped marks in interspaces 2, 3, and 4 wanting.

Antennae, head, thorax, abdomen and abdominal fold as in Troides helena cerebrus, but the abdomen beneath with two rows of black spots.

In the female the differences from cerebrus are:
Forewing: the pale adnervular streaks very broad, very prominent and extended well into the cell.
Hindwing: the basal third of the cell and of interspace 2 black, the middle portion of the latter yellow anteriorly, buffy-white posteriorly; the posterior half of the discal area between the postdiscal spots themselves and between them and the terminal cone-shaped markings more or less irrorated with blackish scales; lastly, the black in interspace 7 interrupted by an inner triangular and an outer small yellow spot.

Antennae, head, thorax and abdomen as in cerebrus, but the abdomen beneath with two lateral and two median rows of black spots.

Range and status 
It is found in northern India, Bangladesh, Nepal, Bhutan, Burma, China, Thailand, Laos, Vietnam, Cambodia, peninsular Malaysia, and Taiwan.

Although it is classified as a species of Least Concern by the IUCN Red List, it may require protection in peninsular Malaya.

Gallery

Subspecies 
 Troides aeacus formosanus Rothschild, 1899
 Troides aeacus insularis Ney, 1905
 Troides aeacus malaiianus Fruhstorfer, 1902
 Troides aeacus szechwanus Okano & Okano, 1983

Related species 

Troides aecus is the nominate member of the Troides aecus species group. The members of this clade are

Troides aeacus C. & R. Felder, 1860
Troides magellanus (C. & R. Felder, 1862)
Troides minos (Cramer, [1779])
Troides rhadamantus (Lucas, 1835)
Troides dohertyi (Rippon, 1893)
Troides prattorum (Joicey & Talbot, 1922)

Cited references

See also 
 Papilionidae
 List of butterflies of India
 List of butterflies of India (Papilionidae)

References 
 
 
 
 
Kurt Rumbucher; Béla von Knötgen (1999). Part.6, Papilionidae. 3, Troides. 1 aeacus- group in Erich Bauer and Thomas Frankenbach Eds. Butterflies of the World Keltern: Goecke & Evers 1999.

External links 

 Butterflycorner
 Biolib
 Butterflies of Indochina

Aeacus
Butterflies of Asia
Butterflies of Indochina
Endemic fauna of Indonesia
Butterflies described in 1860